Ségou is a village in Togo.

References

Populated places in Kara Region